Daniel Howes is business columnist and associate business editor of The Detroit News.

He graduated from the College of Wooster in 1983, and from Columbia University with a master's in international affairs.
From 1999 to 2003, he was European correspondent and automotive columnist.
From 1993 to 1999, he was automotive, investigative, and projects reporter. 
He was a reporter for The Roanoke Times.

He lives in Bloomfield Hills with his wife; they have a daughter.

Awards
2008 Gerald Loeb Award Honorable Mention for Commentary
 Medill award, Northwestern University

References

External links
"Daniel Howes' Blog ", The Detroit News
"Daniel Howes on Spartan Podcast", January 10, 2010

American male journalists
Living people
Gerald Loeb Award winners for Columns, Commentary, and Editorials
College of Wooster alumni
School of International and Public Affairs, Columbia University alumni
The Detroit News people
Year of birth missing (living people)